Khoratpithecus is an extinct genus of pongin primates that lived during the late Miocene (7–9 million years ago) in Myanmar and Thailand.
 
Three species belong to this genus: 
Khoratpithecus chiangmuanensis from Thailand (Chaimanee, Jolly, Benammi, Tafforeau, Duzer, Moussa & Jaeger, 2003) (formerly Lufengpithecus chiangmuanensis)
Khoratpithecus piriyai from Thailand Chaimanee, Suteethorn, Jintasakul, Vidthayanon, Marandat & Jaeger, 2004
Khoratpithecus ayeyarwadyensis from Myanmar Jaeger, Soe, Chavasseau, Coster, Emonet, Guy, Lebrun, Maung, Shwe, Tun, Oo, Rugbumrung, Bocherens, Benammi, Chaivanich, Tafforeau & Chaimanee, 2011

See also
Lufengpithecus
Griphopithecus
Sivapithecus

References

Miocene primates of Asia
Prehistoric apes
Fossil taxa described in 2004
Miocene mammals of Asia
Prehistoric primate genera
Taxa named by Varavudh Suteethorn